"Saccharopolyspora salina" is a bacterium from the genus Saccharopolyspora, which has been isolated from the Bay of Bengal coast of India. It produces one or more cytotoxic compounds.

References

Pseudonocardineae
Bacteria described in 2009